Scappino is an Italian luxury fashion house created in 1914 by Domenico Scappino in Turin, Italy, specializing in silk products like ready-to-wear ties, shoes, watches, jewellery, accessories, sunglasses, and fragrances.

History
Scappino was founded in 1914 in Turin, when World War I started. Within few years the brand started getting recognized in Europe, eventually opening boutiques across the continent.  During the 1930s, the Prince of Piedmont, Umberto II, designated Scappino as the official supplier of the Royal House.
The company later expanded operations in Latin America, opening boutiques in Mexico and Argentina.  With the outbreak of World War II, many shops in Europe were closed.  Because it was not involved in the war, Mexico continued to demand the company's products, as interest in the country spread. At the end of the war, some shops reopened in Italy as well.

As of today, Scappino is an emporium dedicated especially to silk products.
It was announced that soon it will open boutiques in USA, Asia and again in Europe.

See also

 Fashion

References

External links
 Official site

Italian Royal Warrant holders
Fashion accessory brands
Luxury brands
Clothing companies of Italy
Italian fashion designers
Italian brands
Clothing companies established in 1914
Italian companies established in 1914
Bags (fashion)
2000s fashion
2010s fashion
Design companies established in 1914